Love Lost may refer to:

 Love Lost (album), a 1959 album by The Four Freshmen
 "Love Lost" (song), a song by The Temper Trap
 "Love Lost", a song by Mac Miller from his 2011 mixtape I Love Life, Thank You that samples the Temper Trap song

See also
Lost Love (disambiguation)